In mathematics, more specifically in homotopy theory, a simplicial presheaf is a presheaf on a site (e.g., the category of topological spaces) taking values in simplicial sets (i.e., a contravariant functor from the site to the category of simplicial sets). Equivalently, a simplicial presheaf is a simplicial object in the category of presheaves on a site. The notion was introduced by A. Joyal in the 1970s. Similarly, a simplicial sheaf on a site is a simplicial object in the category of sheaves on the site.

Example: Consider the étale site of a scheme S. Each U in the site represents the presheaf . Thus, a simplicial scheme, a simplicial object in the site, represents a simplicial presheaf (in fact, often a simplicial sheaf).

Example: Let G be a presheaf of groupoids. Then taking nerves section-wise, one obtains a simplicial presheaf . For example, one might set . These types of examples appear in K-theory.

If  is a local weak equivalence of simplicial presheaves, then the induced map  is also a local weak equivalence.

Homotopy sheaves of a simplicial presheaf 
Let F be a simplicial presheaf on a site. The homotopy sheaves  of F is defined as follows. We then set  to be the sheaf associated with the pre-sheaf .

Model structures 
The category of simplicial presheaves on a site admits many different model structures.

Some of them are obtained by viewing simplicial presheaves as functors 

The category of such functors is endowed with (at least) three model structures, namely the projective, the Reedy, and the injective model structure. The weak equivalences / fibrations in the first are maps

such that 

is a weak equivalence / fibration of simplicial sets, for all U in the site S. The injective model structure is similar, but with weak equivalences and cofibrations instead.

Stack 

A simplicial presheaf F on a site is called a stack if, for any X and any hypercovering H →X, the canonical map

is a weak equivalence as simplicial sets, where the right is the homotopy limit of
.

Any sheaf F on the site can be considered as a stack by viewing  as a constant simplicial set; this way, the category of sheaves on the site is included as a subcategory to the homotopy category of simplicial presheaves on the site. The inclusion functor has a left adjoint and that is exactly .

If A is a sheaf of abelian group (on the same site), then we define  by doing classifying space construction levelwise (the notion comes from the obstruction theory)  and set . One can show (by induction): for any X in the site,

where the left denotes a sheaf cohomology and the right the homotopy class of maps.

See also 
cubical set
N-group (category theory)

Notes

Further reading 
Konrad Voelkel, Model structures on simplicial presheaves

References 
 
 
B. Toën, Simplicial presheaves and derived algebraic geometry

External links 
J.F. Jardine's homepage

Homotopy theory
Simplicial sets
Functors